Chlebczyn  is a village in the administrative district of Gmina Sarnaki, within Łosice County, Masovian Voivodeship, in east-central Poland.

References

Chlebczyn
Siedlce Governorate
Lublin Governorate
Lublin Voivodeship (1919–1939)